Cochylichroa arthuri, Arthur’s sunflower moth, is a species of moth of the family Tortricidae. It is found in North America, where it has been recorded from Saskatchewan, Manitoba, North Dakota, Indiana, Minnesota, Montana and Ohio.

The wingspan is 12 mm. Adults are on wing from July to September. The forewings are brownish white with an outwardly oblique dark fascia.

The larvae feed within the heads and on the seeds of Helianthus annuus.

Cochylichroa arthuri was formerly a member of the genus Cochylis, but was moved to the redefined genus Cochylichroa in 2019 as a result of phylogenetic analysis.

References

Moths described in 1984
Tortricinae